Eric Cyril Williams (1918–2010) was a British science fiction author active in the 1960s and 1970s, and then again in the last decade of his life. Williams was active in science fiction fandom in the 1930s, contributing the fanzines such as The Satellite. He worked as a bookseller prior to becoming an author.

Bibliography

Science fiction

Novels
Flash (1972)
Homo Telekins (1981)
Largesse from Triangulum (1979)
Monkman Comes Down (1968)
Project: Renaissance (1973)
The Call of Utopia (1971)
The Drop In (1977)
The Time Injection (1968)
Time for Mercy (1979)
To End All Telescopes (1969)

Short stories
"Amenemhet's Gift" (2001)
"Arboreal Interlude" (2003)
"Brides for Mars" (2002)
"Dark City in Glass City" (2000)
"Mr. Hazel's Miracle Carpet" (Dec 1937, Amateur Science Stories)
"My First Space-Ship" (March 1938, Amateur Science Stories)
"Number 7 (1969)
"Something" (1999)
"Sunout" (1965)
"The Desolator" (1965)
"The Egyptian Message" (2000)
"The Garden of Paris" (1965)
"The Martians" (2002)
"The Paper Killer" (2003)
"The Real Thing (1966)
"The Venus Vein" (Dec 1937, Amateur Science Stories)
"The Visitor" (2003)

Anthology appearances
New Writings in SF 5 (1965)
Science Fantasy Vol. 24 No. 75 (1965)
Weird Shadows from Beyond (1965)

References

General references

1918 births
2010 deaths
British science fiction writers
20th-century British novelists